Claudio Martín Cabrera (born 8 August 1979 in Río Cuarto, Córdoba) is a retired Argentine footballer, who played as a right winger.

Career

Cabrera started his career in 2001 with his hometown club Estudiantes de Río Cuarto in the regionalised 3rd division. In 2002, he joined C.A.I. where he played until 2005.

In 2005 Cabrera joined Quilmes of the Argentine Primera, but he soon moved on to join Talleres de Córdoba.

In 2006 Cabrera joined Olimpo de Bahía Blanca where he was part of the squad that won the Apertura 2006 and the Clausura 2007 tournaments of Primera B Nacional to secure automatic promotion to the Primera. In 2007, he joined Argentinos Juniors, his only spell in the Argentine Primera División.

Subsequently, Cabrera played for Talleres (in the third division) and Olimpo, where he once again gained promotion to the first division. For the 2010-11 season, Cabrera joined second division side Aldosivi.

Honours

References

External links
 Argentine Primera statistics
 Football lineups player profile
 BDFA profile

1979 births
Living people
People from Río Cuarto, Córdoba
Argentine footballers
Association football wingers
Comisión de Actividades Infantiles footballers
Aldosivi footballers
Quilmes Atlético Club footballers
Talleres de Córdoba footballers
Olimpo footballers
Argentinos Juniors footballers
Estudiantes de Río Cuarto footballers
Club Atlético Patronato footballers
Deportivo Morón footballers
Sportivo y Biblioteca Atenas de Río Cuarto players
Racing de Córdoba footballers
Club Atlético Fénix players
Argentine Primera División players
Sportspeople from Córdoba Province, Argentina